Maria Winn-Ratliff is an American softball coach who is the current head coach at Trinity Valley CC.

Coaching career

Tyler Junior College
On July 27, 2016, Winn-Ratliff was announced as the new head coach of the Tyler Junior College softball program.

Louisiana Tech
On September 23, 2019, Winn-Ratliff was announced as the new head coach of the Louisiana Tech softball program.

Head coaching record

Junior college

NCAA

References

Living people
Female sports coaches
American softball coaches
Louisiana Tech Lady Techsters softball coaches
Year of birth missing (living people)